Marta Susana Prieto de Oviedo (born 1944) is a Honduran writer who lives in San Pedro Sula.

Biography
Prieto studied Business Administration at the Central American Business Administration Institute (INCAE) and worked at the Chamber of Commerce and Industries of Cortés (CCIC). She directed the Honduran Hotel Association between 1985 and 1990. She was a member of the Chamber of Tourism.

Prieto carried out an important cultural and social management, sponsoring painting, music and lyrics events. She was a founding member of the San Pedro Sula Children's Cultural Center (CCI) and has actively collaborated in the directors of various cultural organizations.

Prieto was part of the editorial board of Thresholds, the supplement of the newspaper Tiempo and has collaborated with the Tragaluz magazine and the Cronopios Supplement writing anthropological and cultural articles,

In 1999, she wrote her first book, the short novel "Melodía de silencios", followed by others that incorporate historical themes from Honduras.

Bibliography 
 Melodía de silencios, 1999
 Animalario, 2002
 Memoria de las sombras, 2005
 Buscando el Paraíso, 2010
 El rapto de la Sevillana, 2015
 100 años haciendo historia

References

1944 births
Living people
People from Puerto Cortés
Honduran women poets
Honduran women writers